Musgrove may refer to:

Places
Musgrove Block, a historic building in Andover, Massachusetts, United States
Musgrove Mill State Historic Site, an American Revolutionary War battlesite in South Carolina, United States

Other uses
Musgrove (surname), including a list of people with the name

See also
Musgrave (disambiguation)
Charlton Musgrove, a village and civil parish in Somerset, England
Musgrove Evans House, a historic site in Tecumseh, Michigan, United States